Highway 10 is the northernmost East-West highway in Jordan. it starts at Karameh Border Crossing, from Freeway 1 on Iraq's border in the east and ends at Shuna al-Shomaliya with a junction with Highway 65 in the west after passing through Mafraq and Irbid.

Roads in Jordan